"Rain" is a song by South Korean singer Kim Tae-yeon, a member of the South Korean girl group Girls' Generation. It was released digitally by SM Entertainment on February 3, 2016.

Background and composition
In January 2016, S.M. Entertainment announced that they were to launch a digital music platform called SM Station, in which SM artists would release a new song every week. "Rain" and its B-side track "Secret" served as the opening single of the project and were released on February 3, 2016. "Rain" is described as a midtempo song with jazz and R&B sounds. Lyrically, it uses rain as a metaphor to describe memories of past love.

Music video
The music video for "Rain" was filmed indoors, having the concept of Taeyeon in a "room of memories", missing a past lover. It alternate between black and white scenes of Taeyeon singing alone in front of a microphone, and colored scenes of her in a flooding room. "Rain" was the most viewed music video by a South Korean act on YouTube in February 2016.

Reception
"Rain" debuted atop South Korea's Gaon Digital Chart. It won the first place on SBS's music program Inkigayo on February 14, 2016. The song received a Digital Bonsang at the 31st Golden Disk Awards.

Track listing
Credits are adapted from Naver.

Charts

Weekly charts

Monthly chart

Year-end chart

Sales

Awards and nominations

Release history

References

External links 
 

2016 singles
SM Entertainment singles
Korean-language songs
2016 songs
Gaon Digital Chart number-one singles
Taeyeon songs
Songs written by Aaron Benward
Songs written by Matthew Tishler
Songs written by Felicia Barton